Sydney Margaret Penny (born August 7, 1971) is an American actress. She is known for her portrayal of Julia Santos Keefer on the soap opera All My Children and Samantha "Sam" Kelly on the CBS soap opera The Bold and the Beautiful. She also starred in the 1998 WB television drama series Hyperion Bay. As a teenager she appeared in the 1985 Clint Eastwood film Pale Rider, and at age 10, she played the young Meggie in the popular TV mini-series The Thorn Birds.

Career
She was born in Nashville, Tennessee, and raised in Chatsworth, California, the daughter of former Western Swing bandleader and comedian Hank Penny and his wife, Shari. An early acting appearance was on the miniseries The Thorn Birds when she was only 11 years old as young Meggie. She also appeared as Dani in The New Gidget and as a pigeon-obsessed youngster in an episode of the police series T. J. Hooker. At the age of 13, Penny played Megan Wheeler in the Clint Eastwood western Pale Rider, released on June 26, 1985. For this performance she was awarded a Young Artist Award at the 7th Youth in Film Awards in December 1985.

She voiced Lucy Van Pelt in the television special It's Magic, Charlie Brown (1981).

She has played the role of St. Bernadette in two French-language films, Bernadette and La Passion de Bernadette.

She played the role of Julia Santos Keefer on the soap opera All My Children, from 1993 to 1996, with guest appearances in 1997 and 2002 and returned to the show in 2005. Penny left the show in May 2008 when Julia was killed off.

Penny has also appeared on the serials Santa Barbara as B.J. Walker during 1992–1993, Sunset Beach as Meg Cummings (filling in for Susan Ward in 1999), Beverly Hills, 90210 and Hyperion Bay as Jennifer.

In August 2003, she was cast as Samantha Kelly on The Bold and the Beautiful. The character never caught on and Penny was bumped to recurring status in late 2004. She last appeared on April 26, 2005, and rejoined All My Children a few months later. She stayed with the show for an additional three years.

Filmography

Film
 Pale Rider (1985) as Megan Wheeler
 Hyper Sapien: People from Another Star (1986) as Robyn
 Bernadette (1988, French) as Bernadette Soubirous
 La Ciociara 1988, Cinema of Italy as Rosetta
 La Passion de Bernadette (1990, French) as Bernadette
 In the Eye of the Snake (1990) as Malika
 Enchanted (1998) as Natalie Ross
 The Pawn (1998) as Megan
 Little Red Wagon (2012) as Ashley Lagare
 Ambush at Dark Canyon (2012) as Madeleine Donovan
 The Perfect Summer (2013) as Alyssa
 Heart of the Country (2013) as Candace
 Heritage Falls (2016) as Heather Fitzpatrick
 Mountain Top (2017) as Judge Coberg

Television
 It's Magic, Charlie Brown (1981, TV Movie) as Lucy Van Pelt (voice)
 Fame (1982, as guest star) as Susan Marshall
 The Capture of Grizzly Adams (1982, TV Movie) as Peg Adams
 The Thorn Birds (1983, TV Mini-Series) as Young Meggie Cleary
 T. J. Hooker (1983) as Katie Coats
 Silver Spoons (1984) as Billie
 The Fourth Wise Man (1985, TV Movie) as Shameir
 News at Eleven (1985, TV Movie) as Melissa Kenley
 The Twilight Zone (1986) as Mary Miletti (segment "Grace Note")
 The New Gidget (1986–1987) as Dani
 Child of Darkness, Child of Light (1991, TV Movie) as Margaret Gallagher
 Santa Barbara (1992–1993) as B.J. Walker
 All My Children (1993–2008) as Julia Santos Keefer
 Hearts Adrift (1996, TV Movie) as Maxine (Max) Deerfield
 Hyperion Bay (1998–1999, main role) as Jennifer Worth
 Sunset Beach (1999, temporary recast) as Meg Cummings
 Beverly Hills, 90210 (2000) as Josie Oliver
 Largo Winch (2001–2003) as Joy Arden
 The Bold and the Beautiful (2003–2005) as Samantha Kelly
 Hidden Places (2006, TV Movie) as Eliza Monteclaire Wyatt
 The Wish List (2010, TV Movie (Hallmark)) as Chloe
 Days of Our Lives (2011) as Dr. Liv Norman
 Drop Dead Diva (2011; episode #3.6) as CEO
 The Wife He Met Online (2012, TV Movie) as Georgia
 Pretty Little Liars (2014–2015) as Leona Vanderwaal
 Killer Crush (2015, TV Movie) as Gaby

References

External links
 
 

Living people
1971 births
Actresses from Tennessee
American child actresses
American soap opera actresses
American television actresses
People from Chatsworth, Los Angeles
People from Nashville, Tennessee
21st-century American women